Simon Talbot (born 26 May 1969) is an English professional offshore yacht racer, who in 2013 was selected as one of the 12 elite sailors who would skipper an entry in the Clipper 13-14 Round the World Yacht Race.

Early life
Talbot was born in London, England, the son of Michael Talbot and his wife Marjorie and has an older brother Antony.

Talbot was educated at Watford Grammar School for Boys. Talbot later attended Imperial College London where he studied for a master's degree in Electrical and Electronic Engineering.

Career
Having grown up in or around the water windsurfing, sailing and fishing, Talbot formally learned to sail at Bury Lake near Rickmansworth, Hertfordshire whilst attending Watford Grammar School for Boys.

Away from sailing, Talbot is a director of the Beyond the Box group of property companies, responsible for Corporate Finance and Law and is also managing partner at Talbot Property Partners.

Significant Campaigns
1996-2002 Miss Sophie (Gecco 391)
2001-2002 Sensor IX (Jeanneau Sunfast 42)
2002-2004 Sensor X (IMX 40)
2004-2005 Fiona VIII (Prima 38)
2005-2009 Resting Goose (Jeanneau Sun Odyssey 49DS)
2010-2012 Selene (Swan 44)
2013-2014 Team GREAT Britain (Clipper 70)
2015-2017 European 2K Team Racing Tour

Team GREAT Britain

Simon's last ocean racing campaign was the Clipper Round the World Yacht Race skippering the GREAT Britain yacht.

Simon's crew of 53, is made up of people from Great Britain and Northern Ireland.

The race start took place at St Katharine Docks in the centre of London, with the boats departing on 1 September 2013.

Recent results
1st in Class, 15th Overall, 2013 JP Morgan Asset Management Round the Island Race.
2nd Overall, London to Brest (Clipper Race, Leg 1).
1st Overall, Rio to Cape Town (Clipper Race, Leg 2).
1st Overall, Cape Town to Albany (Clipper Race, Leg 3).
2nd in Class, 2013 Rolex Sydney Hobart.
2nd Overall, Brisbane to Singapore (Clipper Race, Leg 5).
1st Overall, Singapore to Qingdao (Clipper Race, Leg 5).
1st Overall, Qingdao to San Francisco (Clipper Race, Leg 6).
1st Overall, PSP Logistics Panama 100 Cup (San Francisco to Panama, Clipper Race, Leg 7).2nd Overall, Spirit of Jamaica Chase (Panama to Jamaica, Clipper Race, Leg 7).2nd Overall, Grange Hotels Trophy (Jamaica to New York, Clipper Race, Leg 7).
1st Overall, Den Helder to London Race (Clipper Race, Leg 8).2nd Overall and Most Decorated Yacht, Clipper 13-14 Round the World Yacht Race.
3rd Overall, 2017 Stockholm International Team Race Regatta.

Personal life
Talbot lives on the Essex coast near Colchester. He belongs to the Royal Thames Yacht Club and the Royal Ocean Racing Club.

Awards and honours
He was awarded the title of Runner up Yachtmaster of the Year in 2002.
In December 2014 he was awarded the special recognition award for his significant achievements in promoting British business worldwide.

References

External links
 

1969 births
Living people
English male sailors (sport)
Alumni of Imperial College London
People educated at Watford Grammar School for Boys
British sailors